Sajjadul Hassan is a Bangladeshi retired bureaucrat and former chairperson of Bangladesh Biman airlines. He is the former Senior Secretary at the Prime Minister's Office.

Early life 
Hassan was born in Mohanganj Upazila, Netrokona District. His father, Akhlakul Hossain Ahmed, was a member of the East Pakistan Provincial Assembly. His brother, Justice Obaidul Hassan, is a Justice in the Supreme Court of Bangladesh. He completed his SSC and HSC from Mohanganj Government Pilot High School and Dhaka College respectively. He worked to introduce double shift in Mohanganj Government Pilot High School and renovate Shiyaljani canal in Mohanganj Municipality.

Career 
Hassan had served as the District Commissioner of Cox's Bazar District and Sylhet District. Hassan was made the Personal Secretary-1 to the Prime Minister of Bangladesh from the Division Commissioner of Sylhet Division on 25 February 2015.

On 26 January 2018, Hassan was promoted from Personal Secretary-1 to the Prime Minister of Bangladesh to the acting secretary of the Prime Minister's Office. Tofazzel Hossain Miah, previously the Director General of the Prime Minister's Office, replaced him as the Personal Secretary-1 to the Prime Minister of Bangladesh. He was a special guest at the launching of the call centre service number 333 on 12 April 2018 by Sajeeb Wazed. On 25 December 2019, he was promoted to the rank of Senior Secretary.

Hassan was appointed the Chairperson of the Board of Directors of the state owned Bangladesh Biman on 27 January 2020 by the Ministry of Civil Aviation and Tourism. He replaced Air Marshal Mohammad Enamul Bari. Senior Secretary at the Ministry of Aviation, Mohibul Haque, supported steps to keep Biman Bangladesh under government control in 2020 and prevent it's privatisation under the chairpersonship of Hassan. He oversaw a Dash 8-400, named Dhrubatara, aircraft joining the fleet of Bangladesh Biman in 2020 purchased through a government to government agreement between Bangladesh and Canada.  He is the President of Bangladesh Agricultural Economists Association. In September 2022, the government broke the trustee board of Manarat International University and created a new board which included him.

References 

Living people
Year of birth missing (living people)
People from Netrokona District
Dhaka College alumni
Bangladeshi civil servants
Bangladeshi economists